The 2002 Oceania Swimming Championships were held 11–14 June in Nouméa, New Caledonia.

All swimming competition listed below were swum in a 50m (long-course) pool.

Participating countries
The 2002 Oceania Swimming Championships featured 117 swimmers from:

Event schedule

 Semifinals were held in the 50s and 100s. In the 50s the semifinals were held the same evening as the final; in the 100s the semifinals were held the night before the finals.

Results

Swimming

Men

Women

Overall medal table

References

2002 Oceania Championships results (from www.swiminfo.co.nz) for: Swimming, 5K, 10K, Synchro

Oceania
Oceania Swimming Championships, 2002
Oceania Swimming Championships, 2002
Oceania Swimming Championships, 2002
Oceania Swimming Championships
International aquatics competitions hosted by New Caledonia
Oceania Swimming Championships